Arnaude de Rocas (Μαρία Συγκλητική Maria Syglitiki, aka Arnalda di Roca; died 1570) is a legendary personality from Cyprus, remembered there as a martyr and a Cypriot heroine.

Biography 
According to legend, Maria (Arnalda) was the daughter of Eugene Syglitikos (Zegno Singlitico, count of Roccas/Rochas), who was killed in battle when the Ottoman Turks took Nicosia, capital of Cyprus, on 9 September 1570 after a long siege. Allegedly, she died in an explosion one or two days thereafter. It is said that she managed to set fire to the powder kegs of the ship, while the ship was still in Famagusta Bay.

Arnaude had come to the front lines to help prepare bandages for the wounded fighters who were defending the fort, which was the custom for women at that time. The defending forces repelled two assaults, but not the third, and the fortress fell. Arnaude hid in an underground chapel with her father, Nicolo Dandolo, leader of the defending forces, where she tended to his mortal wounds. When Turkish soldiers found the daughter and her dying father, Arnaude's captors indicated that she would be destined for slavery in the harem of the Sultan Selim. 

She was taken to the central square where she joined about 800 other young Cypriot women who were also bound for enslavement in Turkey. The women were loaded onto a ship at the port of Limassol, Cyprus. The ship was scheduled to sail the next day for Constantinople, modern day Istanbul, Turkey. During the night, however, the entire vessel exploded killing everyone on board including the young women who had all, it is reported, chosen death rather than slavery. Arnaude is credited with causing the explosion by using a lamp to set fire to the ship's powder store as the guards slept.

References

Year of birth missing
1570 deaths
Cypriot women
Rebels from the Ottoman Empire
16th-century women
Christian martyrs
Slavery in the Ottoman Empire

ru:Мария Синклитики